Bennett Branch Sinnemahoning Creek  is a tributary of Sinnemahoning Creek in the U.S. state of Pennsylvania.

The Bennett Branch runs  from headwaters east of DuBois, northeast to its confluence with the Driftwood Branch to form Sinnemahoning Creek.

Course and tributaries
Laurel Run joins the Bennett Branch near the community of Caledonia, Elk County.

See also
List of rivers of Pennsylvania

References

External links
U.S. Geological Survey: PA stream gaging stations

Rivers of Pennsylvania
Tributaries of the West Branch Susquehanna River
Rivers of Elk County, Pennsylvania
Rivers of Clearfield County, Pennsylvania